Jana Tůmová (born ) is a retired Czech female volleyball player. She was part of the Czech Republic women's national volleyball team.

She participated in the 1994 FIVB Volleyball Women's World Championship. On club level she played with Alea KP Brno.

Clubs
 Alea KP Brno (1994)

References

1974 births
Living people
Czech women's volleyball players
Place of birth missing (living people)